Pakistan Life Saving Foundation (also called PALS Rescue or PALS) is a registered Non-Government Organization (NGO) in Pakistan. This internationally accredited NGO was established in 2004 for the purpose of providing life-saving services along the beaches of Karachi (Pakistan). It is the country's only privately run (free public service), near-shore drowning prevention and rescue body. It employs around 250 trained lifeguards that belong to the neighboring coastal fishing communities.

History 
Karachi's coastline stretches around 40 kilometres (25 miles), covering beaches that include Clifton (Seaview), Sandspit, Hawkes Bay, French Beach, Kanupp Point, Paradise Point, Ras Muari (Cape Monze), Sunehri and Mubarak Village. The Arabian sea which meets Pakistan coastline of Karachi and Balochistan, is extremely rough during the monsoon season which starts from mid-May to mid-August. This is also the time which draws the largest number of beach visitors during the year.

Karachi beaches are hazardous because of undeveloped topography. The beach surface is not leveled and modified to minimize hazards. The strong currents have no hindrance due to absence of coral reefs that usually break these currents. Some of the beaches along the coastline have “dumping’ waves” that occur in seemingly calm and low tide sea but hit the beach with strong force. There are also some beaches along the coastlines that have sudden dips and slippery surfaces. The sea is most dangerous in the monsoon season which coincides with summer vacations for schools. It is the time when Karachi beaches see major footfall.  The beach goers are mostly unaware of water safety and do not have swimming skills. The lack of water safety knowledge and scarcity of lifeguards resulted in large number of drowning cases yearly. Eventually in 2004, PALS Rescue was formed as an NGO registered under the Directorate of Social Welfare, Government of Sindh (Pakistan).

Initially PALS worked towards forming a comprehensive lifesaving setup along the most visited beaches of Karachi, Pakistan. PALS approached the established Life Saving Institutions around the world for guidance, support and assistance. Surf Life Saving New Zealand’s Northern Region (SLSNR), offered to help PALS in set up a surf lifesaving establishment along the beaches of Karachi. In 2003, SLSNR sent an 8 member delegation/team to train PALS’ lifeguards. In addition to training, they also donated essential lifesaving equipment. The SLSNR trained 175 lifeguards including Pakistan Navy and City Government Divers. At the end of the 2 week intensive training period, 64 life guards were issued SLSNR Awards and 41 were issued Certificates. In 2005, PALS became an independently established surf lifesaving service.

International Affiliations 
PALS Rescue is an internationally accredited life guarding establishment, representing Pakistan in the International Life Saving Federation (ILS) as a Full Member. It is also closely associated with Surf Life Saving New Zealand (SLSNZ) and holds a membership at the Royal Lifesaving Society (RLSS). SLSNZ delegations usually visit PALS on a yearly basis.

Local Affiliations and Support 
PALS Rescue is operating with support and collaboration of the following local agencies:

 The Pakistan Navy (PN) – who donated 3 of their lifeguard towers to PALS
 The City District Government, Karachi (CDGK)
 Commissioner Karachi
 Station Commander Karachi

Patrol Statistics 

Before 2004, there used to be on average 250+ cases of drowning annually on Karachi beaches.  PALS Rescue has been able to contain this drowning rate to ‘near zero’ to date.  According to the PALS Rescue available data, they have saved almost 5,500 people from drowning along Karachi's beaches. They also conducted over 7,000,000 preventive actions providing advice, guidance or direction to people that mitigated against the risk of drowning. It has provided first-aid to over 6,000 people. Its presence along Karachi's beaches has provided protection to over 8 million beach visitors every year. In 2019, PALS lifeguards saved 176 people from drowning in the monsoon season.

Safe Canal Project 
PALS Rescue initiated the ‘Safe Canal Project’ that will encompassed four of Khairpur's villages. The pilot project was inaugurated in 2019 by Dr. Nafisa Shah who is a Member of the National Assembly (MNA). Under this project, Khairpur's villagers were provided with safety equipment to safeguard themselves, especially women and children against accidents which had earlier been prevalent along canal banks.

This pilot project which is part of an planned, large scale development, connects a buoying net across the width of the canal with supporting poles. Life Jackets are placed along each side. Anyone going close to the canal is required to wear these jackets which safeguards them against drowning and the net will not allow a person to get swept away by the water.

PALS Outdoors 
PALS Outdoors is the commercial wing of PALS Rescue. It was established in 2010 and focuses on providing recreational activities and adventure tours to various locations in Pakistan ( focusing mainly in Karachi and Balochistan areas). PALS Outdoors established a first ever adventure and eco-tourism beach site with the funding from United States Agency for International Development (USAID). The site includes luxury tent accommodations along with activities like water sports, boating, kayaking, fishing, mangrove explorations, bird watching and swimming with dolphins.

See also 

 Lifesaving
 Lifeguard
 List of beaches in Pakistan
 List of non-governmental organizations in Pakistan

References 

Non-governmental organizations
Lifesaving organizations
Swimming in Pakistan
2004 establishments in Pakistan
Organizations established in 2004